Automated machine learning (AutoML) is the process of automating the tasks of applying machine learning to real-world problems. AutoML potentially includes every stage from beginning with a raw dataset to building a machine learning model ready for deployment. AutoML was proposed as an artificial intelligence-based solution to the growing challenge of applying machine learning. The high degree of automation in AutoML aims to allow non-experts to make use of machine learning models and techniques without requiring them to become experts in machine learning. Automating the process of applying machine learning end-to-end additionally offers the advantages of producing simpler solutions, faster creation of those solutions, and models that often outperform hand-designed models. Common techniques used in AutoML include hyperparameter optimization, meta-learning and neural architecture search.

Comparison to the standard approach 
In a typical machine learning application, practitioners have a set of input data points to be used for training. The raw data may not be in a form that all algorithms can be applied to. To make the data amenable for machine learning, an expert may have to apply appropriate data pre-processing, feature engineering, feature extraction, and feature selection methods. After these steps, practitioners must then perform algorithm selection and hyperparameter optimization to maximize the predictive performance of their model. If deep learning is used, the architecture of the neural network must also be chosen by the machine learning expert. 

Each of these steps may be challenging, resulting in significant hurdles to using machine learning. AutoML aims to simplify these steps for non-experts, and to make it easier for them to use machine learning techniques correctly and effectively.

AutoML plays an important role within the broader approach of automating data science, which also includes challenging tasks such as data engineering, data exploration and model interpretation.

Targets of automation
Automated machine learning can target various stages of the machine learning process.  Steps to automate are:
 Data preparation and ingestion (from raw data and miscellaneous formats)
 Column type detection; e.g., boolean, discrete numerical, continuous numerical, or text
 Column intent detection; e.g., target/label, stratification field, numerical feature, categorical text feature, or free text feature
 Task detection; e.g., binary classification, regression, clustering, or ranking
 Feature engineering
 Feature selection
 Feature extraction
 Meta-learning and transfer learning
 Detection and handling of skewed data and/or missing values
 Model selection - choosing which machine learning algorithm to use, often including multiple competing software implementations
 Ensembling - a form of consensus where using multiple models often gives better results than any single model
 Hyperparameter optimization of the learning algorithm and featurization
 Pipeline selection under time, memory, and complexity constraints
 Selection of evaluation metrics and validation procedures
 Problem checking
 Leakage detection
 Misconfiguration detection
 Analysis of obtained results 
 Creating user interfaces and visualizations

See also
 Neural architecture search
 Neuroevolution
 Self-tuning
 Neural Network Intelligence
 AutoAI
 ModelOps

References

Further reading
 
 Ferreira, Luís, et al. "A comparison of AutoML tools for machine learning, deep learning and XGBoost." 2021 International Joint Conference on Neural Networks (IJCNN). IEEE, 2021. https://repositorium.sdum.uminho.pt/bitstream/1822/74125/1/automl_ijcnn.pdf

Machine learning